Southworth is an unincorporated community in Allen County, in the U.S. state of Ohio.

History
A post office called Southworth was established in 1879, and remained in operation until 1910. The community was named for Benjamin F. Southworth, the original owner of the site.

References

Unincorporated communities in Allen County, Ohio
1879 establishments in Ohio
Populated places established in 1879
Unincorporated communities in Ohio